Countess Adrienne Gräfin von Pötting (1856–1909) was an Austrian painter.

Biography
Pötting was born in Chrudim, Bohemia in 1856 to Count Norbert von Pötting and Countess Cajetana Chorinsky von Ledske from Prague. She had one brother, Norbert, who became a public prosecutor, and an older sister, Hedwig, who was the secretary to Bertha von Suttner. She studied under Karl von Blaas and Hans Canon in Vienna.  She exhibited her work in the rotunda of The Woman's Building at the 1893 World's Columbian Exposition in Chicago, Illinois.  Pötting died in Abbazia in 1909.

Gallery

References

External links
 
images of Adrienne von Pötting's work on ArtNet

 
1856 births
1909 deaths
Austrian women painters
19th-century Austrian women artists
19th-century Austrian painters
People from Chrudim
German Bohemian people